The women's individual recurve competition at the 2011 World Archery Championships took place on 4–10 July 2011 in Torino, Italy. 148 archers competed in the qualification round on 4 July; the top 104 archers qualified for the knockout tournament on 7–8 July, with the semi-finals and finals on 10 July. The tournament doubled as the principal qualification tournament for the 2012 Olympics.

In an open competition which saw just two of the top eight seeds reach the quarter final, Chilean Denisse Van Lamoen, ranked 36 in the qualification round, won the women's individual competition by defeating Kristine Esebua of Georgia in the final in four sets.

Seeds
As well as securing qualification for the 2012 Olympics, the top eight scorers in the qualifying round were seeded, and received byes to the third round.

Draw

Top half

Section 1

Section 2

Section 3

Section 4

Bottom half

Section 5

Section 6

Section 7

Section 8

Finals

References

2011 World Archery Championships
World